Ben Bridgewater is the Chief Executive of Health Innovation Manchester bringing together health, academia and industry to accelerate innovation to transform citizens' health and wellbeing.

Between January 2016 and February 2018 Ben worked for CSC (which became DXC Technology following a merger with Hewlett Packard Enterprise Services in April 2017), initially as the UK&I Director of Healthcare strategy and then as the Director of the Healthcare and Lifesciences Global Build Advisory team for DXC Technology.

Until January 2016, he was a cardiac surgeon at the University Hospital of South Manchester for nearly 18 years, described by the Health Service Journal judges as "one of the leaders in measuring quality in the NHS".

He is a leading expert on health informatics, national clinical audit, clinical governance, healthcare transparency, patient experience measurement and digital transformation in healthcare.

Bridgewater was a pioneer in opening up data about outcomes in cardiac surgery down to the level of individual surgeons.  Working with the Society for Cardiothoracic Surgery in Great Britain and Ireland, of which he is a leading member, he has helped to devise a system which enables patients waiting for heart surgery to check the track record of cardiac surgeons and their hospitals on-line before their operation. Measuring clinical outcomes in cardiac surgery has led to a 50% reduction in mortality rates over the past 10 years. He has also helped to create a system, working with the Picker Institute Europe to develop a system which makes public online data for all of University Hospital of South Manchester Trust's consultants.

He led the publication of surgeon level activity and mortality outcomes reporting across 13 specialities on behalf of the Healthcare Quality Improvement Partnership 2013-2016 - HQIP Consultant Outcomes and HQIP Clinical Outcomes Technical Manual.

He was a vocal participant in the debate about the Health and Social Care Act 2012.

Publications
Ben Bridgewater: measuring outcomes for surgery Kings Fund 2011
 Fourth EACTS Adult Cardiac Surgical Database Report: Towards Global Benchmarking (with  Peter K. H. Walton, Robin Kinsman and Jan Gummert) 2010
 Sixth National Adult Cardiac Surgical Database Report 2008: Demonstrating Quality (with Bruce Keogh, Robin Kinsman and Peter K. H. Walton) July 2009)

References

External links
Health Quality Improvement Partnership
Heart Valve Voice
Society for Cardiothoracic Surgery in Great Britain and Ireland

British cardiac surgeons
21st-century British medical doctors
Living people
Year of birth missing (living people)